Claudio Cassinelli (13 September 1938 – 13 July 1985) was an Italian film, stage and television actor.

Life and career 

Born in Bologna to Giuseppina Tafani and Antonio Cassinelli, a well known opera singer, he had two sisters, Paola Cristina and Loretta. Cassinelli began his career in theater, later dedicating himself to film and television work. His film career is divided equally between auteur films (with, among others, Paolo and Vittorio Taviani, Liliana Cavani, Pasquale Festa Campanile, Damiano Damiani) and genre films, especially poliziotteschi and action films.

Cassinelli died in Page, Arizona during the filming of a scene in Sergio Martino's Vendetta dal futuro. He was on a helicopter that crashed into the Navajo Bridge due to pilot error. He was 46 and left three children: Sebastiano, Filippo and Giovanni.

Selected filmography

 China Is Near (1967) - Furio
 Galileo (1968) 
 The Devil Is a Woman (1973) - Rodolfo Solina
 Flavia the Heretic (1974) - Abraham
 What Have They Done to Your Daughters? (1974) - Insp. Silvestri
 Allonsanfàn (1974) - Lionello
 La nottata (1975) - Davide
 Killer Cop (1975) - Commissario Matteo Rolandi
 The First Time on the Grass (1975) - Hans
 The Suspicious Death of a Minor (1975) - Paolo Germi
 Free Hand for a Tough Cop (1976) - Antonio Sarti
 A Matter of Time (1976) - (uncredited)
 Bloody Payroll (1976) - Raul Montalbani
 Blood and Diamonds (1977) - Guido Mauri
 The Mountain of the Cannibal God (1978) - Manolo
 Island of the Fishmen (1979) - Lt. Claude de Ross
 Avalanche Express (1979) - Col. Molinari
 The Great Alligator River (1979) - Daniel Nessel
 The Good Thief (1980) - Jesus
 Lion of the Desert (1980) - Prisoner Escort Guard (uncredited)
 Roma dalla finestra (1982) - Carlo
 Grog (1982) - Commissario
 Scorpion with Two Tails (1982) - Paolo Domelli
 Notturno (1983) - The Contacter
 Hercules (1983) - Zeus
 Unguided Tour (1983)
 Warriors of the Year 2072 (1984) - Cortez
 Murder Rock (1984) - Dick Gibson
 The Adventures of Hercules (1985) - Zeus
 Vendetta dal futuro (1986) - Peter Howell

References

External links 
 

1938 births
1985 deaths
Accidental deaths in Arizona
Actors from Bologna
Italian male film actors
Italian male stage actors
Italian male television actors
Victims of aviation accidents or incidents in 1985
Victims of helicopter accidents or incidents in the United States
20th-century Italian male actors